Prasophyllum constrictum, commonly known as the tawny leek orchid, is a species of orchid endemic to South Australia. It has a single tubular leaf and up to thirty five scented, brown or reddish-brown flowers with a pink or purplish labellum. Richard Sanders Rogers, who named this species, described the flowers as "prune-coloured".

Description
As with others in the genus, the flowers are inverted so that the labellum is above the column rather than below it. The middle of the labellum is narrowed and the upturned part has wavy edges. There is a fleshy, shiny callus in the centre of the labellum and extending almost to its tip. Flowering occurs from October to December.

Taxonomy and naming
Prasophyllum constrictum was first formally described in 1909 by Richard Sanders Rogers from a specimen collected near Tailem Bend and the description was published in Transactions, proceedings and report, Royal Society of South Australia. The specific epithet (constrictum) refers to the constriction of the labellum.

Distribution and habitat
The tawny leek orchid grows in shrubby forest mainly in the Adelaide Hills and Mount Lofty Ranges.

Conservation
Prasophyllum constrictum is listed as "Rare" under the South Australian National Parks and Wildlife Act 1972.

References

External links 
 

constrictum
Flora of South Australia
Endemic orchids of Australia
Plants described in 1909